Linxiang may refer to the following locations in China:

Linxiang  a former name of Changsha, a city in Hunan
Linxiang, Hunan, county-level city of Yueyang, Hunan
Linxiang District, Lincang, Yunnan